Luigi "Gigi" Soffietti is a former Italian racing driver. He entered 56 sports car races and Grands Prix between 1932 and 1938 (48 started) in Alfa Romeo's and Maserati's. Notable entries include the Mille Miglia and Targa Florio, but also the German Grand Prix, the Tripoli Grand Prix (both three times), and the Monaco Grand Prix (twice).

References
All information from this article can be found in:
 racingsportscars.com
 The Golden Era - Drivers 
 teamdan.com - 1935 AIACR European Driver Championship
 teamdan.com - 1936 AIACR European Driver Championship
 teamdan.com - 1937 AIACR European Driver Championship
 teamdan.com - 1938 AIACR European Driver Championship
 Luigi Orsini - Franco Zagari - The Scuderia Ferrari 1929 to 1939 - Osprey

Citations:

Living people
Year of birth missing (living people)
Italian racing drivers
Mille Miglia drivers
European Championship drivers